The Silver Slugger Award is awarded annually to the best offensive player at each position in both the American League (AL) and the National League (NL), as determined by the coaches and managers of Major League Baseball (MLB). These voters consider several offensive categories in selecting the winners, including batting average, slugging percentage, and on-base percentage, in addition to "coaches' and managers' general impressions of a player's overall offensive value". Managers and coaches are not permitted to vote for players on their own team. The Silver Slugger was first awarded in 1980 and is given by Hillerich & Bradsby, the manufacturer of Louisville Slugger bats. The award is a bat-shaped trophy, 3 feet (91 cm) tall, engraved with the names of each of the winners from the league and plated with sterling silver.

From 1980 to 2019, and in 2021, Designated hitters (DH) only receive a Silver Slugger Award in the American League because the batting order in the National League includes the pitcher; therefore, pitchers receive the National League award instead. However, due to the universal DH rule taking place in the  season, no pitcher was awarded the Silver Slugger Award and was given instead to the best designated hitter in the National League. Beginning in 2022, the pitcher Silver Slugger Award was retired after MLB announced the full-time implementation of the universal DH rule, thus the DH Silver Slugger Award will now be awarded in National League as well. David Ortiz has won the most Silver Sluggers as a designated hitter, capturing four consecutively from 2004 to 2007, and winning again in 2011, 2013 and 2016. Two players are tied with four wins. Paul Molitor won the award four times with three different teams: the Milwaukee Brewers in 1987 and 1988; the Toronto Blue Jays in 1993, when the team won the World Series; and the Minnesota Twins in 1996. Edgar Martínez won the award four times with the Seattle Mariners (1995, 1997, 2001, 2003). Don Baylor won the Silver Slugger three times in four years (1983, 1985–1986) as a designated hitter with the New York Yankees and the Boston Red Sox, and Frank Thomas won it twice with the Chicago White Sox (1991, 2000). Harold Baines won the award while playing for two separate teams in the same season; he was traded by the White Sox to the Texas Rangers in the middle of the 1989 season. Shohei Ohtani was the most recent winner.

Martínez set the records for the highest batting average and on-base percentage in a designated hitter's winning season with his .356 and .479 marks, respectively, in 1995. Manny Ramírez' slugging percentage of .647 is best among all winners at the position. Ortiz hit 54 home runs during the 2006 season, when he won his third consecutive award, and his 2005 total of 148 runs batted in is tied with Rafael Palmeiro's 1999 mark for best among designated hitters.

Key

American League winners

National League winners

In , the COVID-19 pandemic resulted in implementation of a universal DH during the shortened season. The National League gave a Silver Slugger Award for designated hitter for the first time and did not award one for pitchers.

See also
Edgar Martínez Award

References

Inline citations

External links
Louisville Slugger - The Silver Slugger Award

Silver Slugger Award
Awards established in 1980